Nicholas Szymanek, better known as Nik Szymanek, is a British amateur astronomer and prolific astrophotographer, based in Essex, England.

Originally a train driver in the London Underground, he started to be interested in astronomical CCD imaging shortly before 1991. His interest in this kind of observational astronomy rose in 1991, after he met Ian King, another amateur astronomer and a fellow from the local Havering Astronomical Society.

Since that time he got most known for his deep sky CCD images and his contributions to education and public outreach. He collaborates with professional astronomers and works with big telescopes located at La Palma in the Canary Islands, and at Mauna Kea Observatories at the Hawaiian Islands. He publishes his pictures in astronomical magazines and has written a book on astrophotography called Infinity Rising.

His imaging and image-processing abilities brought him the Amateur Achievement Award of the Astronomical Society of the Pacific in 2004.

Gallery

References

External links 
 CCDLand – Nik Szymanek's web page
 

20th-century British astronomers
Amateur astronomers
Astrophotographers
21st-century British astronomers
Living people
Year of birth missing (living people)